Marc Rémillard is a former French-Canadian electronic music artist, now music producer, sound engineer, storm chaser, guitarist and video game developer.

History

Marc Rémillard began work as a musician in Quebec City in 2007.

In 2010, after moving to Montreal, Marc Rémillard started managing Royal Fetish Recordings.

From 2010 to 2016, Marc Rémillard released music under his name and under the name OUTBRK and performed music in Canada, United States of America, and Europe. He shared the stage with some of the world's biggest names, such as Skrillex, Major Lazer, Zedd, Pendulum, and many others.

2016 marked the ending of Marc Remillard's relationship with Electronic Dance Music. He has since then been working as a Mixer, Composer, Producer and Sound Designer in Montreal. In 2020, Marc produced the debut solo album 'Blue' for rapper and singer Emma Beko, part of the duo Heartstreets.

Discography

Singles

 Pimp Hand Strong with Messinian and Frederik Olufsen (Play Me Records)
 Mother Sucker, with Frederik Olufsen - 2011 (BugEyed Records)
 Downtown - 2010. (Trouble & Bass)
 Baby It's You - 2010.

EPs

 Get Glitched - 2008 (Gato Negro Music).
 Feeling Fresh - 2009 (So French Records).
 Jurassic - 2010 (Royal Fetish Recordings).
 Jungle Knockout - 2011 (Simma)
 Aftermath - 2013 (Heavy Artillery Recordings)
 United - 2013 (Heavy Artillery Recordings)

Remixes by Marc Remillard

 "Lead the Galaxy" by Deluce, 2008.
 "Distant Lovers" by Louis La Roche, 2009.
 "Temple" by The Noizy Kidz, 2009.
 "Blisters" by Ravage! Ravage!, 2009.
 "Talkin' About" by Dee, 2009.
 "Playing into Cosmos" by SUPER PIXEL!, 2009.
 "Until We Meet Again" by Emma-Lee, 2009.
 "Stalingrad" by Tenkah, 2009.
 "Vague" by We Are Wolves, 2010.
 "Sunday 86" by Ahllex, 2010.
 "We Will Never" by Press Play On Me, 2010.
 "Nightcall" by Kavinsky, 2010.
 "Wild Birds" by Minitel Rose, 2010

Storm Chasing

Since 2007, Marc Rémillard has been storm chasing in Canada and in the United States of America. He joined Québec Vortex in 2008 and is now a shareholder in the company that now works with Hydro Météo for severe weather forecasting and monitoring in the Province of Quebec. Marc appears on TV, Radio, and other medias regularly for interviews about storm chasing and severe weather events.

Game Development

 OUTBRK - The Multiplayer Storm Chasing Game

OUTBRK is a multiplayer storm chasing simulation game being developed for PC, set in a fictive, 625 km2 reproduction of America’s tornado alley. Players chase storms to earn points, which can be used to buy, upgrade, and customize vehicles. From 24 February to 24 March 2020, a Kickstarter campaign for the game successfully raised $36,000 CAD ($28,843 USD).

References

Living people
French house musicians
Year of birth missing (living people)